In the human brain, the superior cerebellar peduncle (brachium conjunctivum) is a paired structure of white matter that connects the cerebellum to the midbrain. It consists mainly of efferent fibers, the cerebellothalamic tract that runs from a cerebellar hemisphere to the contralateral thalamus, and the cerebellorubral tract that runs from a cerebellar hemisphere to the red nucleus.  It also contains afferent tracts, most prominent of which is the ventral spinocerebellar tract. Other afferent tracts are the trigeminothalamic fibers, tectocerebellar fibers, and noradrenergic fibers from the locus coeruleus. The superior peduncle emerges from the upper and medial parts of the white matter of each hemisphere and is placed under cover of the upper part of the cerebellum.

Structure
Superior cerebellar peduncles are connected together by the anterior medullary velum, which can be followed upward as far as the inferior colliculi, under which they disappear.

Below, they form the upper lateral boundaries of the fourth ventricle, but as they ascend they converge on the dorsal aspect of the ventricle and thus assist in forming its roof.

Decussation

The decussation of superior cerebellar peduncle is the crossing of fibers of the superior cerebellar peduncle across the midline, and is located at the level of the inferior colliculi. It comprises the cerebellothalamic tract, which arises from the dentate nucleus (therefore also known as dentatothalamic tract), as well as the cerebellorubral tract, which arises from the globose and emboliform nuclei and project to the contralateral red nucleus to eventually become the rubrospinal tract. It is also known as horseshoe-shaped commissure of Wernekinck. It is important as an anatomical landmark, as lesions above it cause contralateral cerebellar signs, while lesions below it cause ipsilateral cerebellar signs.

Additional images

References

External links
 
 
 https://web.archive.org/web/20080518232033/http://isc.temple.edu/neuroanatomy/lab/atlas/micn/
 http://www.neuroanatomy.wisc.edu/Bs97/TEXT/P18/sum.htm
 NIF Search - Decussation of superior cerebellar peduncle via the Neuroscience Information Framework

Cerebellar connections
Midbrain